The Nebraska Cornhuskers women's volleyball team competes as part of NCAA Division I, representing the University of Nebraska–Lincoln in the Big Ten. Nebraska plays its home games at the Bob Devaney Sports Center, and has sold out every home match since 2001. The team has been coached by John Cook since 2000.

The program was founded in 1975 and is one of the most decorated in women's volleyball, with more wins than any other program and five national championships. Nebraska has been ranked in every weekly poll since the introduction of the AVCA National Poll in 1982 and has spent more weeks ranked number one than any other program. The Cornhuskers' ninety-eight All-Americans are the most in the country. Nebraska regularly leads the NCAA in average attendance and has participated in several of the highest-attended women's volleyball games ever played.

History

Pat Sullivan (1975–76)
Pat Sullivan became Nebraska's first head coach when the program was founded shortly after the passing of Title IX in 1972. Sullivan compiled an 83–21 record over two seasons, including an AIAW regional final appearance in 1975 and NU's first Big Eight championship in 1976.

Terry Pettit (1977–99)
Terry Pettit was hired as Nebraska's second head coach in 1977. Pettit, an Indiana native, was an English teacher and volleyball coach at Louisburg College in North Carolina when a fellow coach found out about Nebraska's open job and directed Pettit to apply. From 1977 to 1999, he led the Cornhuskers to a record of 694–148, winning twenty-one conference championships and the 1995 national championship.

In his twenty-three years as head coach, Pettit built the program into a national power. Under his guidance, Nebraska appeared in nineteen consecutive NCAA tournaments, including six national semifinals, two national runner-up finishes, and NU's first national title. Pettit's teams won a conference championship in all but two seasons during his tenure. His list of honors includes induction into the AVCA Hall of Fame in 2009, USA Volleyball All-Time Great Coach Award, and several national and regional coach of the year awards from various publications. Under Pettit, Nebraska became one of the first schools to offer scholarships to female athletes. In 1978, Terri Kanouse and Shandi Pettine were the first players to receive full scholarships for volleyball, and just three years later, the university allowed Pettit to offer up to twelve scholarships. Pettit coached thirty-six AVCA All-Americans at Nebraska, the highest number of any school in that time span.

Pettit's only national championship as a head coach came in 1995. After dropping an early-season match to Stanford, NU swept twenty-two consecutive opponents and won thirty-one straight matches. Nebraska defeated Texas 3–1 to win the title, and AVCA National Player of the Year Allison Weston was among three Huskers named first-team All-Americans. Before the 1999 season, Pettit hired former assistant John Cook as associate head coach. Following Nebraska's loss in the national semifinals, Pettit retired and Cook became head coach. In 2020, Pettit was inducted into the Nebraska Athletics Hall of Fame.

John Cook (2000–present)

Cook succeeded the retiring Pettit before the 2000 season after a seven-year stint as head coach at Wisconsin. He was Pettit's assistant coach from 1989 to 1991. In twenty years at Nebraska, Cook has guided the Huskers to four national championships, five other national semifinal appearances and an NCAA tournament berth in each season. Cook was named National Coach of the Year in 2000 and 2005, Central Region Coach of the Year four times, and conference coach of the year six times. He was awarded the USA Volleyball All-Time Great Coach Award in 2008, and was inducted into the AVCA Hall of Fame in 2017. Under Cook, Greichaly Cepero, Christina Houghtelling, and Sarah Pavan won AVCA National Player of the Year, and Pavan won the Honda-Broderick Cup in 2007 as the Collegiate Female Athlete of the Year.

In his first year as NU's head coach, Cook guided the Huskers to their second national championship. After starting the season outside the national top ten, Nebraska went 20–0 in Big 12 play and defeated Cook's former team, Wisconsin, in a five-set national title match to cap a 34–0 season and become the second undefeated team in NCAA volleyball history. Sophomore setter Greichaly Cepero was named National Player of the Year and won the Honda Sports Award as the best female athlete in collegiate sports. Nebraska finished the 2001 and 2002 seasons 20–0 in conference play, but lost late in the tournament to Stanford and Hawaii, ending both seasons 31–2. Nebraska's seventy-seven game Big 12 winning streak ended with a loss at Kansas State in 2003 as the Cornhuskers failed to make it out of a regional.

Nebraska earned the number one overall seed in the 2004 NCAA tournament, which began an NCAA-record eighty-eight consecutive weeks the Cornhuskers were ranked atop the AVCA weekly poll. The Huskers fell to two-time defending champion USC but freshman Sarah Pavan was named AVCA National Freshman of the Year. Pavan became one of the most decorated players in volleyball history, including four First-Team All-American honors and the 2006 National Player of the Year award. Nebraska was again the top seed in the 2005 NCAA Tournament and swept through the first five rounds, but was upset by Washington in the national title match.

Nebraska lost only once in the 2006 regular season as its streak at the top of the rankings continued. The Cornhuskers were the top seed in the NCAA Tournament for the third consecutive year and returned to the national title match after a five-set win over Minnesota. Nebraska dropped the first set to Stanford but won the next three to win the school's third championship in front of a then-NCAA volleyball-record crowd of 17,209. Nebraska swept twenty-four of its thirty-three opponents and lost just fourteen sets all season and became the first team to win the championship while hosting the finals since UCLA in 1991. Pavan won numerous awards after the season and sophomore Jordan Larson was named a first-team All American.

Nebraska's season opener in 2007 marked the program's 1,000th game, a sweep of Tennessee in the AVCA Showcase. The Cornhuskers' eighty-eight week streak at number one came to an end in October, but NU won its fourth straight Big 12 title. After surviving an upset bid by unseeded Michigan State in the NCAA Tournament, Nebraska fell to California in the regional final. Pavan joined Texas softball pitcher Cat Osterman as the only repeat Big 12 Female Athlete of the Year and Nebraska placed a then-record five players on All-America teams. Nebraska won its fifth consecutive Big 12 title in 2008 and advanced through the first three rounds of the NCAA Tournament to face Washington. After losing the first two sets, Nebraska came back to tie the match, and used a nine-point run to win set five. Nebraska met undefeated Penn State in the national semifinal and again fell behind 2–0. The Huskers rallied to deal the Nittany Lions their first two set losses of the season, snapping their NCAA-record 111 consecutive set wins, but lost the match in five sets.

Nebraska's NCAA-record ninety-game home winning streak came to an end at the beginning of the 2009 season. In the 2009 NCAA Tournament Texas became the first team to beat NU three times in one season after ending the Huskers' five-year stretch atop the Big 12. In 2010, the University of Nebraska announced it would be ending its fifteen-year relationship with the Big 12 and joining the Big Ten. The Cornhuskers won the Big 12 in 2010, departing with an all-time conference record of 278–22.

Move to the Big Ten

The University of Nebraska joined the Big Ten Conference in 2011. This meant for the first time NU would regularly play longtime rival Penn State along with other nationally relevant programs including Minnesota, Wisconsin, and Illinois. The Huskers won the Big Ten in their first year of competition but failed to make a regional semifinal for the first time since 1993. Nebraska did not win another Big Ten title until 2016 and failed to make the national semifinals in six straight seasons, the longest stretch for the program in over thirty years. Nebraska's drought ended in 2015 when the Cornhuskers swept former Big 12 rival Texas to win the program's fourth national championship in front of an NCAA-record crowd in Omaha. Mikaela Foecke had nineteen kills in the title game and became the third freshman named the NCAA tournament's Most Outstanding Player. The Cornhuskers spent much of the following season ranked number one in the country and won the program's first conference title since 2011. In the 2016 NCAA Tournament, Nebraska fought off two match points to defeat Penn State in the regional semifinals but fell to Texas in the national semifinals.

Nebraska's 2017 season opened with consecutive losses to Florida and Oregon, but the Cornhuskers finished the regular season with just two more losses, ultimately sharing the Big Ten title with Penn State. NU defeated the top-seeded Nittany Lions in five sets to advance to the national title match, and then beat Florida 3–1 to win the school's fifth national title. The championship match took place in Kansas City in front of an NCAA-record crowd of 18,516. Outside hitter Mikaela Foecke was again named the tournament's Most Outstanding Player, making her one of four players to win the honor more than once. NU made a program-record fourth straight trip to the national semifinals in 2018, but fell to Stanford in a five-set national title match.

After a pair of regional final losses in 2019 and 2020 (though the 2020 Tournament was held in the spring of 2021), NU defeated No. 2 Texas and No. 3 Pittsburgh in the 2021 Tournament to reach the school's tenth national title match; Nebraska's five-set loss to Wisconsin set a new NCAA volleyball attendance record. Following the season, freshman libero Lexi Rodriguez became the second Cornhusker and first libero to win AVCA National Freshman of the Year.

Coaches

Coaching history

Assistant coaching history

Coaching staff

Venues

Nebraska Coliseum
NU compiled an all-time record of 511–36 at the 4,030-seat Nebraska Coliseum, losing just three home matches in thirty-three seasons of conference play. In 1991, the Cornhuskers played home games at the Bob Devaney Sports Center while the Coliseum was being renovated specifically to host volleyball matches. NU has hosted at least one NCAA Tournament match every year since 1984, including a 52–4 postseason record at the Coliseum. Nebraska established an NCAA record with their 88th consecutive home win in 2009, a streak that ended at ninety when UCLA defeated NU in front of an NCAA regular season-record crowd of 13,870. In 2008, the AVCA's Kathy DeBoer described the Coliseum as "the epicenter of volleyball fandom".

The Coliseum was one of few collegiate arenas designed specifically for volleyball. It is noted for its classical architecture and intimate atmosphere. At the Coliseum, the Huskers began an NCAA record for most consecutive sellouts in a women's sport, a streak that continues at the Devaney Center. The Coliseum was the subject of a CBS Sports documentary in 2011.

Bob Devaney Sports Center
Nebraska's volleyball program moved to the Bob Devaney Sports Center in 2013, which was vacated when Pinnacle Bank Arena was built for NU's basketball teams. The Devaney Center's capacity was decreased from 13,596 to 7,907 with luxury suites on the south side of the court. Despite the increase in capacity from the Coliseum, the Huskers' sellout streak continued and stands at 285, the longest in any NCAA women's sport. Nebraska has led the country in attendance every year since moving to the Devaney Center, averaging over 8,000 fans per game each season. The move to the Devaney Center has made Nebraska's volleyball program profitable each year, a rarity in women's college athletics. With no financial support from tax dollars, tuition, or student fees, the team is entirely self-sufficient.

Highest-attended matches

Nebraska has played in nine of the ten highest-attended matches in NCAA Tournament history.

Awards
National Player of the Year
Allison Weston – 1995
Greichaly Cepero – 2000
Christina Houghtelling – 2005
Sarah Pavan – 2006

National Freshman of the Year
Sarah Pavan – 2004
Lexi Rodriguez – 2021

National Coach of the Year
Terry Pettit – 1986, 1994
John Cook – 2000, 2005

All-Americans
Nebraska has had fifty players account for ninety-eight overall and forty-eight first-team AVCA All-American selections.

National records
Team

Wins: 1,407
Winning percentage in a season: 1.000 (2000, tied with four others)
Consecutive winning seasons: 48 (1975–2021)
Consecutive non-losing seasons: 48 (1975–2021)
Assists in a match: 116 (Nov. 5, 1988 vs. Texas)
Blocks per set in a season: 4.18 (2001)
Weeks ranked No. 1: 100
AVCA All-America athletes: 50
AVCA All-America awards: 98

Individual
Hitting percentage in a match (min. 10 kills): 1.000 (Tracy Stalls – Nov. 24, 2007 vs. Texas Tech; Megan Korver – Sep. 25, 1998 vs. Iowa State; Lauren Stivrins – Sep. 28, 2018 vs. Northwestern)
Assists in a match: Lori Endicott, 109 (Nov. 5, 1988 vs. Texas)
Blocks in a season: Melissa Elmer, 250 (2005)
Blocks per set in a season: Melissa Elmer, 2.17 (2005)

Season-by-season results

Beach volleyball
The Nebraska Cornhuskers women's beach volleyball team began play in the spring of 2013 as the school's twenty-second intercollegiate sport. In 2016, the NCAA began sponsoring a beach volleyball tournament (previously the sport was run by the AVCA), but Nebraska did not attempt to qualify. Despite the sport's increasing popularity, Nebraska, nearby Wayne State, and Eastern Illinois fund the only volleyball programs in the Midwest. NU generally plays the bulk of its season during a spring break trip to California and Hawaii, and its beach roster is made entirely of players from its indoor program. John Cook, who coaches both programs, has said the school views beach volleyball primarily as a training and recruiting tool for its indoor team. Beach volleyball competes as an independent, making it one of only three programs at Nebraska not affiliated with the Big Ten.

On March 8, 2017, Nebraska hosted Missouri Baptist at the Hawks Championship Center. The match, closed to the public due to space limitations, was the first collegiate beach volleyball match held in the state of Nebraska. The Cornhuskers swept the Spartans 5–0.

In 2007, Jordan Larson and Sarah Pavan defeated student-athletes from seven other schools to win the Collegiate Beach Volleyball Championship, an invitational tournament featuring two players per school.

Coaching history

Season-by-season results

Notes

References